Keith Anthony Ripley (born 10 October 1954) is an English former professional, who played in the Football League as a full back for Huddersfield Town and Doncaster Rovers.

Playing career

Huddersfield Town
Ripley signed for Huddersfield Town in 1978 from Gainsborough Trinity by Tom Johnstone, however a few months later Johnston was sacked and replaced by Mick Buxton and only played one more game before being signed by Billy Bremner at Barnsley.

References

1954 births
Living people
Sportspeople from Normanton, West Yorkshire
English footballers
Association football fullbacks
Gainsborough Trinity F.C. players
Huddersfield Town A.F.C. players
Doncaster Rovers F.C. players
English Football League players